KNEA (970 AM/95.3 FM) is a radio station broadcasting a sports format. Licensed to Jonesboro, Arkansas, United States, it serves the Jonesboro area.  The station is currently owned by East Arkansas Broadcasters of Jonesboro, LLC.  It is also the flagship station for the EAB Red wolves Sports Network's broadcasts of Arkansas State University baseball and women's basketball.

The station currently airs a mix of local sport shows and is a Fox Sports affiliate.  Local shows are hosted  or co-hosted by Bud Schroeppel, Brad Bobo, Randy Myers and Kara Richey.

External links

NEA